Silvio Micali (born October 13, 1954) is an Italian computer scientist, professor at the Massachusetts Institute of Technology and the founder of Algorand, a proof-of-stake blockchain cryptocurrency protocol. Micali's research at the MIT Computer Science and Artificial Intelligence Laboratory centers on cryptography and information security.

In 2012, he received the Turing Award for his work in cryptography.

Personal life
Micali graduated in mathematics at La Sapienza University of Rome in 1978 and earned a PhD degree in computer science from the University of California, Berkeley in 1982; for research supervised by Manuel Blum. Micali has been on the faculty at MIT, Electrical Engineering and Computer Science Department, since 1983. His research interests are cryptography, zero knowledge, pseudorandom generation, secure protocols, and mechanism design.

Career
Micali is best known for some of his fundamental early work on public-key cryptosystems, pseudorandom functions, digital signatures, oblivious transfer, secure multiparty computation, and is one of the co-inventors of zero-knowledge proofs. His former doctoral students include Mihir Bellare, Bonnie Berger, Shai Halevi, Rafail Ostrovsky, Rafael Pass, Chris Peikert, and Phillip Rogaway.

In 2001 Micali co-founded CoreStreet Ltd, a software company originally based in Cambridge, Massachusetts which implemented Micali's patents involving checking the status of digital certificates (mainly applicable to large enterprise and government-sized digital and physical identity projects). Micali served as Chief Scientist at CoreStreet. CoreStreet was bought by ActivIdentity in 2009.

In the early 2000's Micali also founded Peppercoin, a micro-payments system which was acquired in 2007.

In 2017, Micali founded Algorand.

Awards and honors
Micali won the Gödel Prize in 1993. He received the RSA Award for Excellence in Mathematics in 2004. In 2007, he was selected to be a member of the National Academy of Sciences and a Fellow of the International Association for Cryptologic Research (IACR). He is also a member of the National Academy of Engineering and the American Academy of Arts and Sciences. He received the Turing Award for the year 2012 along with Shafi Goldwasser for their work in the field of cryptography.
In 2015 the University of Salerno acknowledged his studies by giving him an honoris causa degree in Computer Science.
He was elected as an ACM Fellow in 2017.

References

1954 births
Living people
Theoretical computer scientists
Italian computer scientists
American computer scientists
American people of Italian descent
Modern cryptographers
Gödel Prize laureates
MIT School of Engineering faculty
UC Berkeley College of Engineering alumni
Members of the United States National Academy of Engineering
Members of the United States National Academy of Sciences
Fellows of the Association for Computing Machinery
Turing Award laureates
International Association for Cryptologic Research fellows
People associated with cryptocurrency
Scientists from Sicily